Ambadwet is a village situated near the banks of the Mula river, Taluka Mulshi, Pune district, India. Mahindra Conveyor Systems, a subdivision of the Indian automobile manufacturer Mahindra & Mahindra, has a facility of manufacturing material handling equipment like conveyor belts in this village.

References

Villages in Pune district